Charles John Diamond (July 19, 1936May 10, 2020) was a former American football tackle who played four seasons in the American Football League (AFL) with the Dallas Texans/Kansas City Chiefs. He played college football at the University of Miami and attended Archbishop Curley-Notre Dame High School in Buena Vista, Miami, Florida. Diamond was also a member of the BC Lions of the Canadian Football League. He was a member of the Dallas Texans team that won the 1962 AFL championship.

References

External links
Just Sports Stats
Fanbase profile

2020 deaths
1936 births
Players of American football from Miami
American football offensive tackles
Miami Hurricanes football players
Dallas Texans (AFL) players
Kansas City Chiefs players
BC Lions players
Archbishop Curley-Notre Dame High School alumni
Players of Canadian football from Miami